Sri Sai Ram Institute of Technology (SSIT) is an engineering institution located in the suburbs of Chennai, Tamil Nadu, India.

History

Sairam) has extended its branches in many fields. One among them is Sri Sairam Institute of Technology. 
Sri Sai Ram Institute of Technology, Chennai, established in the year 2008 by jambulingam, Chairman of Sapthagiri Educational Trust, is non-profitable, and non-minority institution. The College is functioning at Sai Leo Nagar.

The college is affiliated to Anna University and also approved by All India Council for Technical Education, New Delhi.

Rankings

The National Institutional Ranking Framework (NIRF) ranked it 192 among engineering colleges in 2020.

Campus locality

The college is situated in a constructed area of 83.050 sq.m. at Sai Leo Nagar, West Tambaram Chennai, with facilities with regard to Classrooms, Workshops, Drawing Halls, Laboratories, Library, Auditorium, Audio Visual (A/C) Hall, Seminar Halls, Canteen & Sports complex. The college also has its own perennial water resources to cater to its various needs.

Infrastructure

Central and Departmental Libraries
National and International journals
Supplementary digital resources (CD-ROMs and audio cassettes)
Computer labs
No  WiFi Zone
Auditorium without air conditioning facility
Outdoor facilities
Athletic track
Cricket pitch
Basketball courts
Volleyball courts
Football fields
Dining Halls
Special Dining Hall is Available for VIPs.
Lunch Provided for students
Transportation
Fleet of 200 buses plying most of the routes in Chennai city

Courses offered

Sairam currently offers undergraduate degrees in engineering in the following specializations.
 B.E. Mechanical Engineering
 B.E. Electrical & Electronics Engineering
 B.E. Electronics and Communication Engineering
 B.E. Computer Science and Engineering
 B.Tech. Information Technology
 B.E. Civil Engineering

postgraduate degrees in
MBA
M.E Industrial Safety Engineering

References

Chapters

IEEE Students chapter was established in the year 2013. Providing Tech Meets and Industrial Visits to  students of the community.
ISTE chapter was established in the year 2013. Providing Tech Meets and Industrial Visits to  staff community.
CSI Students chapter was established in the year 2010. Providing Tech Meets and Industrial Visits to  students of the community.

Engineering colleges in Chennai